Bissali is a village in Rawalpindi, Punjab on Chak Beli Khan Rawat road. It is located at 33.3963° N, 73.1372° E E with an altitude of 682 meters.

Telecommunication
The PTCL provides the main network of landline telephone. Many ISPs and all major mobile phone, Wireless companies operating in Pakistan provide service in Bassali.

Languages
Punjabi is the main language of Bassali, other languages are Urdu Pothohari , and rarely spoken language Pashto.

References 

Villages in Rawalpindi District